Poul Mik-Meyer (born 16 February 1943 in Copenhagen, Denmark, dead 15 October 2021) is a Danish former Olympic sailor in the Star class. He finished 4th in the 1968 Summer Olympics together with Paul Elvstrøm. He also won the 1967 Star World Championships together with Paul Elvstrøm.

References

Olympic sailors of Denmark
Danish male sailors (sport)
Star class sailors
Nordic Folkboat class sailors
Sailors at the 1968 Summer Olympics – Star
1943 births
Living people
Skovshoved Sejlklub sailors
Star class world champions
World champions in sailing for Denmark
European Champions Soling
Soling class world champions
Sportspeople from Copenhagen